Éanna Murphy (born 1990 in Clareen, County Offaly, Ireland) is an Irish sportsperson.  He plays hurling with his local club Seir Kieran and has been a member of the Offaly senior inter-county team since 2009.

Playing career

Club

Murphy plays his club hurling with Seir Kieran.

Inter-county

Murphy has lined out in all grades for Offaly.  He started in 2008 as a member of the county's minor hurling team before subsequently joining the Offaly under-21 team.  He enjoyed little success in either grade.

Murphy was just out of the minor grade when he joined the Offaly senior hurling team in 2009.  He made his debut as a substitute in a National Hurling League game against Carlow, however, he remained on the fringes of the team for the next few years.  Murphy made his championship debut against Dublin in 2011.

References

1990 births
Living people
Seir Kieran hurlers
Offaly inter-county hurlers